George Keim is a retired American football coach. He served as the head coach of Bridgewater College in Bridgewater, Virginia from 1960 to 1964, amassing a record of 8–27–1.

Keim is a 1954 graduate of McPherson College in McPherson, Kansas where he was a co-captain of the 1952 Kansas Collegiate Athletic Conference championship football team.

Head coaching record

References

External links
 McPherson College Hall of Fame profile

Year of birth missing (living people)
Living people
Bridgewater Eagles football coaches
McPherson Bulldogs football coaches
McPherson Bulldogs football players